, also known as Udo Domain, was a Japanese domain of the Edo period. It was associated with Higo Province in modern-day Kumamoto Prefecture.

In the han system, Uto was a political and economic abstraction based on periodic cadastral surveys and projected agricultural yields.  In other words, the domain was defined in terms of kokudaka, not land area. This was different from the feudalism of the West.

History
The domain was headed by a cadet branch of the Hosokawa clan of Kumamoto.  The Uto Domain (30,000 koku) was created in Higo Province when Hosokawa Tadaoki abdicated, so that Hosokawa Tatsutaka would have a fief to inherit upon his father's death.  However, Tatsutaka died the same year, and rights of inheritance were transferred to his first son Hosokawa Yukitaka (1637-1690), so that he and his young siblings would be not be left impoverished.  The child Yukitaka thus became the first lord of the newly created Uto Domain on the death of his father in 1646.  He also became head of a cadet branch of the Hosokawa clan.

List of daimyōs 
The hereditary daimyōs were head of the clan and head of the domain.

Hosokawa clan, 1646–1870 (tozama; 30,000 koku)

Yukitaka
Arikata
Okinori
Okisato
Okinori
Tatsuhiro
Tatsuyuki
Tatsumasa
Yukika
Tatsunori
Yukizane

See also 
 List of Han
 Abolition of the han system

References

External links
 "Uto" at Edo 300 
  Uto City Digital Museum 

Domains of Japan